Kim Won-jun (born 4 May 1991) is a South Korean ice hockey defenceman currently playing for Anyang Halla of Asia League Ice Hockey. He competed at the 2018 Winter Olympics.

References

External links

1991 births
Living people
HL Anyang players
Ice hockey players at the 2018 Winter Olympics
Kiekko-Vantaa players
South Korean ice hockey defencemen
Olympic ice hockey players of South Korea
Asian Games silver medalists for South Korea
Medalists at the 2017 Asian Winter Games
Asian Games medalists in ice hockey
Ice hockey players at the 2017 Asian Winter Games